The Conrad C.III was a six-cylinder, water-cooled inline aircraft engine designed by Robert Conrad. It was used on some German training aircraft during World War I. The engine was mainly produced under license by the German Nationale Automobil Gesellschaft.

Development

After having designed two aircraft engines for the German Kaiserpreis aircraft engine competition of 1912/13, Robert Conrad prepared an  six-cylinder aircraft engine for the second Kaiserpreis competition anticipated to take place in 1914–1915. Further improvements on the engine design were done in 1915 by Robert Conrad while he was working for the Deutsche Motorenbau-Gesellschaft. His work resulted in a six-cylinder water-cooled engine with increased bore which was capable of delivering  at 1400 rpm. After a successful type test in February 1916 the engine was assigned the designation C.III (C for Conrad) by the German military.

Due to insufficient production capacity at the Deutsche Motorenbau-Gesellschaft, the engine was produced by the Nationale Automobil-Gesellschaft (NAG).

The new 210 hp variant however turned out to be unreliable and so subsequent versions of the engine were again rated , although with various design improvements over the original C.III.

Variants

Engine production was undertaken by NAG under license. Despite various adaptions of the original design all variants had the same bore and stroke.

C.III initial design by Deutsche Motorenbau-Gesellschaft (Conrad), license produced by NAG as C.III Nag.
C.III Nag initial production variant of the C.III engine, license production by NAG, wet-sump lubrication system.
C.III Nag a improved production variant, improvements over the preceding C.III Nag include revised T-shaped intake manifolds and a dry-sump lubrication system with revised oil sump and oil pump.
C.III Nag b improved production variant, improvements over the preceding C.III Nag a include an oil pump fed valvetrain lubrication system, a revised air pump for pressurizing the fuel system and a revised central placement of the two carburettors, along with provisions for mounting a wireless generator on the admission side of the engine.
C.IIIa adapted and uprated variant of the initial C.III design, only small number of engines produced, turned out to be unreliable.
C.IIIb Nag , no further details given.
C.IIIav Nag , new design, no further details given.

Applications

The Conrad C.III (Nag) engine was primarily allocated for training machines because it was found to be too heavy for use in fighter aircraft.

 DFW C.Vc (training aircraft)

 Rumpler C.Ic (Germ) (training aircraft, built by Germania Flugzeug-Werke)

 Gotha G.IV (SSW) (training aircraft, built by Siemens-Schuckertwerke)

 LVG D.III (one prototype aircraft built)

Preserved engines

 A preserved NAG C.III engine is on public display at the Polish Aviation Museum in Kraków

 A NAG C.III, serial number 13217, is part of the Museum of Applied Arts & Sciences Barraclough Collection in Sydney

 A preserved NAG C.III engine is part of Capetti's Collection at the Politecnico di Torino

Specifications (C.III NAG)

See also
List of aircraft engines

References

1910s aircraft piston engines